James Cerretani and Adil Shamasdin were the defending champions, but chose not to compete this year.

Marco Cecchinato and Matteo Viola won the title, defeating Frank Moser and Alexander Satschko 7–5, 6–0 in the final.

Seeds

Draw

References
Main Draw

Canella Challenger - Doubles